The 2008–2009 Connecticut Huskies men's basketball team represented the University of Connecticut in the 2008–2009 NCAA Division I basketball season. Coached by Jim Calhoun, the Huskies played their home games at the XL Center in Hartford, Connecticut, and on campus at the Harry A. Gampel Pavilion in Storrs, Connecticut. The Huskies were members of the Big East Conference.

The Huskies finished the season 31–5, 15–3 in Big East play to finish in a tie for second place. They lost to Syracuse in the quarterfinals of the Big East tournament. In the NCAA tournament, the Huskies received a No. 1 seed in the West Region and advanced to their third Final Four with wins over Chattanooga, Texas A&M, No. 17 Purdue, and No. 9 Missouri. In the Final Four at Ford Field, they lost to No. 8 Michigan State 73–82.

Roster
Listed are the student athletes who are members of the 2008–2009 team.

2008 recruiting class

Regular season

The Huskies' season began with the team ranked No. 2 in the AP Poll. behind the University of North Carolina. Off to a quick start, UConn opened with a string of eleven straight victories over non-conference opponents, including a sweep of the Paradise Jam tournament in the U.S. Virgin Islands. During this stretch, the Huskies faced three teams that were ranked in the Top 25, including No. 8 Gonzaga in an overtime thriller in Seattle.

The first Big East Conference game of the season came at home against Georgetown, which the Huskies lost 74–63. This was the start of a 19-game stretch where 18 of the games were against conference opponents, and where their opponents were ranked in nine of the games. After this first loss, the Huskies went on to win 13 straight, staying comfortably atop the Big East Conference standings. Among these was a 68–51 victory at No. 7 Louisville— the eventual outright Big East Champions.

The Huskies reached No. 1 in the rankings on February 2, 2009, and held it for three weeks. During this span junior guard Jerome Dyson, one of the team's biggest scoring threats and its best guard defender, injured his knee. He would not be able to play for the rest of the season. The team spent the final few weeks of the regular season adjusting to their smaller rotation. A 76–68 loss at home to No. 4 Pittsburgh knocked them from the top spot. They would win their next three games, including at No. 8 Marquette, which was Coach Jim Calhoun's 800th career victory in Division I basketball. After one week at No. 2, UConn was again No. 1 in the polls, until a loss at No. 3 Pittsburgh to finish the regular season once again bumped the Huskies from the top.

The Huskies finished the regular season with 27 wins and 3 losses, with a conference record of 15–3. The team was not ranked out of the top 5 in the AP Poll at any point in the season.

Post-season
In the quarterfinals of the Big East tournament, UConn took on Syracuse. The game would prove to be a historic event, as it took a Big East record six overtimes before Syracuse ultimately triumphed, 127–117. The contest is tied as the second longest in NCAA Division I history.

The Huskies earned the No. 1 seed in the West Regional of the NCAA tournament. They began play in Philadelphia, Pennsylvania, where they had two blowout victories against Chattanooga and Texas A&M. They moved on to Glendale, AZ for the West regionals, first defeating Purdue 72–60, then outlasting a pressing Missouri squad in the Elite Eight, 82–75.

The following weekend the Huskies were in Detroit, MI for a Final Four matchup against the Midwest's No. 2 seed, Michigan State. The game was close throughout, until the Spartans began to take control near the ten-minute mark of the second half. UConn would make one last run and cut the deficit to three late in the game, but Michigan State made key free throws and held on to win, 82–73. UConn's final record was 31 wins and 5 losses.

Schedule and results

|-
!colspan=9 style=|Exhibition

|-
!colspan=9 style=| Regular season

|-
!colspan=9 style=|Big East tournament

|-
!colspan=9 style=|NCAA tournament

Rankings

Postseason awards
Second Team All-America:
Hasheem Thabeet, Center, Jr.

National Defensive Player of the Year
Hasheem Thabeet

Big East Co-Players of the Year:
Hasheem Thabeet
with DeJuan Blair, Pittsburgh, Center, So.

Big East Defensive Player of the Year: 
Hasheem Thabeet

All-Big East First Team:
Hasheem Thabeet

All-Big East Second Team:
A.J. Price, Guard, Sr.

All-Big East Third Team:
Jeff Adrien, Forward, Sr.

Big East All-Rookie Team:
Kemba Walker, Guard, Fr.

Team players drafted into the NBA

References

UConn Huskies men's basketball seasons
Connecticut Huskies
NCAA Division I men's basketball tournament Final Four seasons
Connecticut
2008 in sports in Connecticut
2009 in sports in Connecticut